Gerhard Giebisch (1927 – April 6, 2020) was a cellular and molecular physiologist and a Sterling Professor emeritus at Yale School of Medicine. He held an M.D. degree from the University of Vienna which he got in 1951. He died on April 6, 2020, aged 93.

References

1927 births
2020 deaths
Date of birth missing
American physiologists
University of Vienna alumni
Yale University faculty
Yale Sterling Professors
Austrian emigrants to the United States
Place of birth missing